The list of shipwrecks in 1894 includes ships sunk, foundered, grounded, or otherwise lost during 1894.

According to the American newspapers of 1894, the winter and spring storms of December 1893 to April 1894 proved to be one of the most disastrous for the United States, particularly the Cape Cod area, since 1860. The eastern seaboard of the continent had already faced a fierce hurricane season in 1893 when over 2,000 people died.

January

4 January

12 January

14 January

16 January

17 January

18 January

20 January

22 January

23 January

24 January

28 January

29 January

Unknown date

February

1 February

2 February

6 February

11 February

12 February

14 February

15 February

16 February

17 February

19 February

23 February

24 February

26 February

28 February

March

2 March

4 March

5 March

7 March

8 March

11 March

13 March

15 March

16 March

17 March

21 March

22 March

Unknown date

April

1 April

3 April

4 April

7 April

11 April

12 April

14 April

16 April

21 April

22 April

24 April

27 April

Unknown date

May

1 May

3 May

5 May

7 May

10 May

11 May

20 May

25 May

31 May

June

1 June

2 June

3 June

6 June

11 June

13 June

16 June

18 June

19 June

21 June

23 June

24 June

25 June

July

1 July

5 July

8 July

10 July

17 July

18 July

19 July

20 July

23 July

24 July

25 July

26 July

28 July

29 July

30 July

31 July

Unknown date

August

1 August

2 August

3 August

4 August

5 August

6 August

7 August

8 August

9 August

10 August

12 August

20 August

22 August

23 August

24 August

26 August

27 August

29 August

30 August

Unknown date

September

3 September

7 September

8 September

9 September

10 September

11 September

12 September

13 September

16 September

17 September

18 September

22 September

23 September

25 September

26 September

27 September

28 September

Unknown date

October

1 October

6 October

7 October

8 October

10 October

11 October

12 October

13 October

20 October

21 October

24 October

25 October

27 October

28 October

29 October

31 October

Unknown date

November

2 November

3 November

4 November

5 November

6 November

8 November

12 November

13 November

16 November

18 November

19 November

22 November

23 November

24 November

26 November

27 November

29 November

30 November

Unknown date

December

1 December

3 December

5 December

7 December

8 December

9 December

10 December

12 December

13 December

17 December

22 December

27 December

28 December

31 December

Unknown date

Unknown date

References

See also

1894